Harry Whittington (1927–2023) was an American lawyer, real estate investor, and political figure from Austin, Texas.

Harry Whittington may also refer to:

Harry Whittington (author) (1915–1989), American mystery novelist
Harry B. Whittington (1916–2010), British paleontologist